Patrick Mark Cobbold (20 June 1934 – 16 December 1994) was an English businessman and a grandson of the Victor Cavendish, 9th Duke of Devonshire.

He was educated with his elder brother John at Wellesley House and Eton College. He was 10 when their father, Lieutenant Colonel Ivan Cobbold, was killed in the Guards Chapel, London, on 18 June 1944 when a flying bomb (V1) hit the Chapel during the Sunday morning service.

He served as a director of the family brewery Tolly Cobbold and joined the board of Ipswich Town F.C. in 1964. He became the fifth member of his family to chair the club (1976–1991). During his chairmanship of the club, Ipswich won the FA Cup and the UEFA Cup, as well as finishing Football League First Division runners-up on two occasions and supplying the England national football team with a new manager in Bobby Robson in 1982.

He died in December 1994 at the age of 60, three years after retiring as chairman of Ipswich Town.

References

External links
 Pride of Anglia
 "Patrick Mark Cobbold" at The Peerage

1934 births
1994 deaths
People educated at Eton College
People from Suffolk Coastal (district)
English football chairmen and investors
Ipswich Town F.C. directors and chairmen
Patrick
20th-century English businesspeople